Gaius Furnius was a Roman senator  during the reign of Augustus, and consul in 17 BC with Gaius Junius Silanus as his colleague.

He was the son of Gaius Furnius, who had been a staunch adherent of Marcus Antonius until 31 BC.  The younger Furnius successfully reconciled his father and Octavian, and the elder Furnius became consul designatus in BC 29.  Tacitus reported that a certain Furnius was put to death in the reign of Tiberius, AD 26, for adultery with Claudia Pulchra, but it is doubtful whether he was the same person.

See also
 Furnia (gens)

References

1st-century BC births
Imperial Roman consuls
Year of death missing
Furnii